is a railway station in the city of Nasushiobara, Tochigi, Japan, operated by the East Japan Railway Company (JR East).

Lines

Station layout
This station has two elevated side platforms with the station building underneath for Tohoku Shinkansen services, and two ground-level island platforms serving three tracks for Utsunomiya Line services. The station has a Midori no Madoguchi staffed ticket office.

Platforms

History

The station opened on November 24, 1898, originally named . From October 12, 1909, the station became part of the Tohoku Main Line.

On June 23, 1982, the Tohoku Shinkansen opened, and the station was renamed Nasushiobara.

Passenger statistics
In fiscal 2019, the station was used by an average of 5291 passengers daily (boarding passengers only). The Tohoku Shinkansen portion of the station was used by an average of 3371 passengers daily (boarding passengers only).

Surrounding area

Highway
 
Nasushiobara Post Office
Nasushiobara Park

See also
 List of railway stations in Japan

References

External links

 JR East station information 

Stations of East Japan Railway Company
Railway stations in Tochigi Prefecture
Tōhoku Shinkansen
Tōhoku Main Line
Utsunomiya Line
Railway stations in Japan opened in 1898